Ignasi Aballí (born in 1958) is a Spanish artist. He has exhibited at the Venice Bienniale, the Gwangju Bienniale and the Sydney Bienniale. He received the prestigious Joan Miró prize in 2015.

Aballí held a traveling exhibition between 1995 and 2015, which involved shows at MACBA in Barcelona (Spain), the Ikon Gallery in Birmingham (UK), and ZKM in Karlsruhe (Germany). He exhibited at the Museo Nacional de Arte Reina Sofía, Madrid in 2015.

References

Sources
 
 
 
 

Spanish contemporary artists